Ma Wan Chung is a village in Tung Chung on Lantau Island, Hong Kong. It is located on the southeastern coast of Tung Chung Bay.

Administration
Ma Wan Chung is a recognized village under the New Territories Small House Policy.

See also
 Chek Lap Kok
 Tung Chung Battery
 Tung Chung Development Pier
 Yat Tung Estate

References

External links

 Delineation of area of existing village Ma Wan Chung (Tung Chung) for election of resident representative (2019 to 2022)

Villages in Islands District, Hong Kong
Tung Chung